The Tobler hyperelliptical projection is a family of equal-area pseudocylindrical projections that may be used for world maps. Waldo R. Tobler introduced the construction in 1973 as the hyperelliptical projection, now usually known as the Tobler hyperelliptical projection.

Overview
As with any pseudocylindrical projection, in the projection’s normal aspect, the parallels of latitude are parallel, straight lines. Their spacing is calculated to provide the equal-area property. The projection blends the cylindrical equal-area projection, which has straight, vertical meridians, with meridians that follow a particular kind of curve known as superellipses or Lamé curves or sometimes as hyperellipses. Tobler's hyperelliptical projection is given as:

For a purely cylindrical equal-area, ; for a projection with pure hyperellipses for meridians, ; and for weighted combinations, .

See also

 List of map projections

References

Map projections
Equal-area projections